Okenia evelinae is a species of sea slug, specifically a dorid nudibranch, a marine gastropod mollusc in the family Goniodorididae.

Distribution
This species was described from Ubatuba, Brazil. It has been reported from Brazil to Lake Worth Lagoon, Florida.

Description
This Okenia has a narrow body and six pairs of short lateral papillae. There are two papillae on the mid-line of the back and two more on either side of the papilla which is just in front of the gills. The body is translucent white with opaque white spots. The bases of the rhinophores are brown and this pigment may form an indistinct line down both sides of the back and tail.

The maximum recorded body length is 8 mm.

Habitat 
Minimum recorded depth is 0 m. Maximum recorded depth is 0 m.

Feeding habits
The diet of this species is the ctenostome bryozoan, Amathia distans Busk, 1886.

References

Goniodorididae
Gastropods described in 1957